The 2021–22 Major Clubs Limited Over Tournament was a List A cricket competition that took place in Sri Lanka. It ran from 27 October to 30 November 2021, with twenty-six teams taking part. Eight overseas cricketers played in the tournament. Nondescripts Cricket Club were the defending champions, having won the previous year's tournament.

The tournament was heavily impacted by rain, with 85 of the 156 matches in the group stage being washed out. Nondescripts Cricket Club, Ragama Cricket Club, Sri Lanka Army Sports Club and Tamil Union Cricket and Athletic Club all qualified for the semi-finals. Both the semi-final matches were impacted by further rain, with each match going into their respective reserve days. Tamil Union Cricket and Athletic Club beat Sri Lanka Army Sports Club by 47 runs to advance to the final. The semi-final match between Ragama Cricket Club and Nondescripts Cricket Club finished in a no result, with Ragama Cricket Club progressing to the final due to their better finish in the group stage. Tamil Union Cricket and Athletic Club won the tournament, beating Ragama Cricket Club by 36 runs in the final.

Group stage

Group A

Group B

Finals

References

External links
 Series home at ESPN Cricinfo

Major Clubs Limited Over Tournament
Major Clubs Limited Over Tournament